Katharine Merry (born 21 September 1974) is an English former sprinter. She won the bronze medal in the 400 metres at the 2000 Sydney Olympics and was the fastest woman in the world over 400 m in 2001, with her career best of 49.59 seconds. She also represented Great Britain at the 1996 Atlanta Olympics and won the 200 metres at the 1993 European Junior Championships.

Career
Born in Dunchurch, Warwickshire, Merry had a career that spanned 20 years. A member of the Birchfield Harriers athletics club, at the age of 12 she topped the UK Under 13 rankings in seven different events. She was the fastest girl in the world aged 14 years, and started her international GB career aged just 13, staying on the junior team for a record six years, winning five Junior Championships and a total of six medals. She became a successful senior athlete with her Olympic medal in Sydney in the "Race of the Games", winning bronze behind the Australian favourite, Cathy Freeman, in front of 112,000 people at Stadium Australia.

The following year she became World number One. She was coached by fellow Olympic medallist Linford Christie in his Cardiff-based training squad, which included fellow Olympic medallist Darren Campbell. She is also with Christie's sports agency, Nuff Respect. Merry still holds various UK age-record bests, including U/13 high jump and several sprints, as well as the Senior UK Indoor 200 m record of 22.83 secs. She also holds World age-records, including 7.35 secs for 60 m indoors, when aged 14. She is third-fastest on the UK All Time 400 m list with a time of 49.59 seconds.

After suffering from a bone spur growth on her right heel bone, and two operations, Merry announced her official retirement from athletics in July 2005. She had been affected by the injury since 2001 and was struggling to get it fully healed. It had prevented her from resuming proper training, meaning she could not get back to her year 2000 form. Despite that, she still ended the 2001 season as the world's fastest female 400 m runner.

Post-athletics
Merry now works freelance in the media on radio and TV. She worked for the BBC at the Olympics in Beijing and London and was the sole field event commentator for the Channel 4 coverage of the Paralympic Games in 2012. At the inaugural Invictus Games in 2014, Merry did live trackside interviews. She has also worked for Sky TV, Eurosport and Channel Five. A multi-tasker, Merry now commentates, presents and hosts sporting events around the world.

Merry appeared on the BBC One gameshow All New Celebrity Total Wipeout on 25 September 2010, where she struck up a rivalry with John Regis, the man who, in her words, "ate all the pies". She "ran" the qualifier in 2:16, beating Regis by 50 seconds, and then beating him again in the next two rounds, but losing finally in the Wipeout Zone, finishing third behind Regis and eventual winner DJ JK. She won overall, 3 events to 1.

She is a regular on BBC One's A Question of Sport and BBC Radio 5 Live's Fighting Talk. In December 2013, Merry came third out of four contestants on Celebrity Mastermind on BBC One. Her specialist subject was Aston Villa F.C. 1980–1990.

Merry was inducted into the England Athletics Hall of Fame in 2018.

At the 2020 Olympic Games in Tokyo, Merry became the first female in-stadium announcer at an Olympic Games.

Personal life
Merry was based in Cardiff while training with Linford Christie, before moving to Bristol after retirement. Merry married her partner Leon Daniels, a recruitment consultant, in September 2014. Their son was born in February 2011 and their daughter in March 2014. The family lives in Birmingham.

She is a supporter of Aston Villa football club.

International competitions

Personal bests

References

External links
 

1974 births
Living people
English female sprinters
Athletes (track and field) at the 1996 Summer Olympics
Athletes (track and field) at the 2000 Summer Olympics
Olympic athletes of Great Britain
Olympic bronze medallists for Great Britain
Sportspeople from Rugby, Warwickshire
Birchfield Harriers
European Athletics Championships medalists
World Athletics Championships athletes for Great Britain
Medalists at the 2000 Summer Olympics
Olympic bronze medalists in athletics (track and field)
Olympic female sprinters